The Valur men's football team, commonly known as Valur, is the men's football department of the Knattspyrnufélagið Valur multi-sport club. It is based in Reykjavík, Iceland, and currently plays in the Besta deild karla, the top-tier men's football league in Iceland. The team plays it home games at Hlíðarendi located in Reykjavík. The team's colors are red and white. Valur has spent most of it´s time in Icelandic top flight football, having only played 3 seasons in the clubs history outside the top tier. Valur is one of the most successful football clubs in Iceland with 23 Icelandic championships. It holds the record attendance to a football match in Iceland with 18,243 spectators in attendance v Benfica in 1968.

Valur participated in the Icelandic men's soccer tournament for the first time in 1915 and became the Icelandic champion for the first time in 1930. In total, it has won the Icelandic championship 23 times, most recently in 2020.

In a reshake in the fall of 2022 following a disappointing season Valur appointed Arnar Grétarsson as manager soon after the he was sacked as manager of KA Akureyri, after having notable success as manager in the northern capital the Icelandic giants hope to bring stability to their setup. Along with Arnar Grétarsson Valur appointed Sigurður Höskuldsson former manager of Leiknir Reykjavík as assistant manager.

European competition
Valur first competed in Europe at the 1966–67 European Cup Winners' Cup Preliminary Round, playing to a draw (1–1) in its first match against Standard Liège, ultimately losing on aggregate 9–2. Since then, the club has participated in European competition 20 times, never advancing beyond the second round of any tournament.

Players

Current squad

Coaches

 Guðmundur H. Pétursson (1930)
 Reidar Sörensen (1933–35)
 Murdo MacDougall (1935–37)
 Murdo MacDougall &  Robert Jack (1937–38)
 Murdo MacDougall (1938)
 Joe Devine (1939), (1948)
 Hermann Hermannsson (1955)
 Óli B. Jónsson (1967–31 December 1968)
 Yuri Illichev (1 July 1973 – 30 June 1974), (1 July 1976 – 30 June 1978)
 Gyula Nemes (1978–79)
 Volker Hofferbert (1980)
 Klaus-Jürgen Hilpert (1982)
 Claus Peter (1982–83)
 Ian Ross (1 January 1984 – 31 December 1987)
 Hörður Helgason (1 January 1988 – 1 August 1989)
 Guðmundur Þorbjörnsson (1989)
 Ingi Björn Albertsson (1990–91)
 Kristinn Björnsson (1992–93)
 Kristinn Björnsson (1995)
 Sigurður Dagsson (1996)
 Sigurður Grétarsson (1996)
 Kristinn Björnsson (1997–99)
  Ejub Purišević (2000–01)
 Þorlákur Árnason (2002–03)
 Njáll Eiðsson (2004)
 Willum Þór Þórsson (1 August 2005 – July 2009)
 Atli Eðvaldsson (4 July 2009 – September 2009)
 Gunnlaugur Jónsson (October 2009 – 31 December 2010)
 Kristján Guðmundsson (1 January 2011 – 31 December 2012)
 Magnús Gylfason (1 January 2013 – 31 October 2014)
 Ólafur Jóhannesson (31 October 2014–2019)
 Heimir Guðjónsson (2019-2022)
 Ólafur Jóhannesson (17 July 2022 - 31 Oct 2022)
 Arnar Grétarsson (31 Oct 2022 - present)

Honours 
Úrvalsdeild
 Champions (23): 1930, 1933, 1935, 1936, 1937, 1938, 1940, 1942, 1943, 1944, 1945, 1956, 1966, 1967, 1976, 1978, 1980, 1985, 1987, 2007, 2017, 2018, 2020

Icelandic Cup
 Champions (11): 1965, 1974, 1976, 1977, 1988, 1990, 1991, 1992, 2005, 2015, 2016

Icelandic League Cup
 Champions (3): 2008, 2011, 2018

Icelandic Super Cup
 Champions (11): 1977, 1979, 1988, 1991, 1992, 1993, 2006, 2008, 2016, 2017, 2018

References

External links
Official website

 
Football clubs in Iceland
Association football clubs established in 1911
Football clubs in Reykjavík
1911 establishments in Iceland